Joseph F. Martin (May 12, 1878 – March 19, 1946) was a lawyer and politician, and was a justice of the Wisconsin Supreme Court.

Biography
Martin was born in Rockland, Wisconsin, one of ten children of Edward and Bridget Martin. He graduated from West De Pere High School in 1897.

Career
Martin studied law at a law firm run by John Wigman and his holder brother, Patrick H. Martin, and at the University of Wisconsin, though he never graduated. He was admitted to the bar in 1903. He was active in civic affairs and was a member of the local school board. Martin served one term in the Wisconsin State Assembly after winning election in 1902. At age 24, he was the youngest person to have served in the Assembly at that time.

After the Assembly, he returned to law practice with his brothers John F. Martin and Patrick, and later with his nephew, John E. Martin, who would later go on to become Chief Justice of the Wisconsin Supreme Court.  He would serve on the Brown County Board of Education, and was President of the board at the time he was appointed to the Supreme Court.

He was appointed a justice of the Wisconsin State Supreme Court on December 31, 1934, by Governor Albert G. Schmedeman, who was a close friend. He would win election to a full ten-year term on the court in 1937, soundly defeating attorneys Glenn P. Turner and Fred M. Wylie. He remained on the court until his death in 1946.

He was a member of the Democratic National Committee, the Knights of Columbus, the Benevolent and Protective Order of Elks, and the Lions Clubs International.

Personal life and family

Joseph Martin married Mildred Eleanor Wright on October 5, 1904. They lived in Green Bay and had four daughters, three of whom survived to adulthood.

He died of a heart attack in Green Bay on March 19, 1946.

References

External links

Politicians from Green Bay, Wisconsin
Democratic Party members of the Wisconsin State Assembly
Justices of the Wisconsin Supreme Court
1878 births
1946 deaths
People from Brown County, Wisconsin